The Committee on Heraldry of the New England Historic Genealogical Society, established in 1864, is the world's oldest non-governmental body primarily concerned with heraldry.

Purpose 
The committee was charged, on 3 February 1864, by the council of the New England Historic Genealogical Society "to collect and preserve information in regard to heraldry"  and to otherwise deal with all matters to do with the subject for the society.

Roll of Arms 
The committee authenticates and registers coats of arms rightfully borne by "American colonists, or immigrants to the United States, who were rightfully armigerous according to the authorities and customs of their countries of origin, or those already resident here during colonial times who were granted arms by such authorities", publishing these historic arms in their Roll of Arms. Only historic arms dating from before 1900 are published in this Roll of Arms.  The roll itself is published in pamphlets called parts, the first of which was published in 1928; but each segment of the roll also appears in an issue of The New England Historical and Genealogical Register.

The committee illustrates the published Roll of Arms with only the escutcheons or shield of arms for the registration. However, in the text of the Roll of Arms the full achievement, and other related matters are discussed.

In 2013 the Committee on Heraldry published a one-volume edition of the complete Roll of Arms to date (registrations 1–741), edited and with a historical introduction and notes by the committee's secretary at the time, Henry L. P. Beckwith.

One need not be entitled to the arms in order to apply for their registration. Genealogists and others often apply to register arms having nothing to do with their own ancestry purely to put them on record with the committee.

Recording of modern and assumed arms 
As of 1933, the Committee on Heraldry has also recorded coats of arms which are not eligible for inclusion in the above Roll of Arms. At that time, the committee began recording assumed arms (arms created and used in colonial or recent times without formal sanction by a government heraldic authority). In 1972, the committee no longer included in their Roll of Arms any arms granted in the 20th century to the use of Americans by foreign heraldic authorities; these also are now recorded separately.

History 
The committee's 1899 and 1914 reports on heraldry are considered two of the key documents in the history of United States Heraldry.

See also

United States heraldry 
Heraldry societies
The Heraldry Society
Heraldry Society of Scotland
Royal Heraldry Society of Canada
Royal Belgian Genealogical and Heraldic Office
International Register of Arms

External links
 Committee on Heraldry 
New England Historic Genealogical Society

References 

1864 establishments in Massachusetts
New England Historic Genealogical Society
New England Historic Genealogical Society
Organizations established in 1864
Heraldic societies